William Craig Reynolds (March 16, 1933 – January 3, 2004) was a fluid physicist and mechanical engineer who specialized in turbulent flow and computational fluid dynamics. He completed his undergraduate degrees, as well as his doctorate, all at Stanford University, in 1954, 1955, and 1957, respectively, after which he joined the faculty. He was chairman of the Mechanical Engineering Department from 1972 to 1982 and again from 1989 to 1992. Reynolds was one of the pioneers in Large eddy simulation for fluid modeling. He was elected to the National Academy of Engineering in 1979. He won the Fluid Engineering Award of the American Society of Mechanical Engineers in 1989 and the Otto Laporte Award by the American Physical Society in 1992.

References

Further reading

External links

1933 births
2004 deaths
Fluid dynamicists
Stanford University Department of Mechanical Engineering faculty
Scientists from the San Francisco Bay Area
Members of the United States National Academy of Engineering
20th-century American engineers
Fellows of the American Physical Society